I Used to Know Her: The Prelude is the fourth EP by American singer H.E.R., released on August 3, 2018, by RCA Records.

Track listing
Credits adapted from Spotify.

Charts

References

2018 EPs
Albums produced by D'Mile
Contemporary R&B EPs
RCA Records EPs
H.E.R. albums